Several uses of Malao are known to Wikipedia:

 a character in The Five Ancestors, children's series
 a location in Vanuatu
 the ancient city-state of Malao on the Somali peninsula identified with the historic city of Berbera.